WBT may refer to:

 WBT (AM), a radio station, Charlotte, North Carolina, US
 WBT-FM, a radio station, Chester, South Carolina, US
 WLNK, a radio station, Charlotte, North Carolina, US; was WBT-FM
 Warrington's Own Buses, a bus company in Warrington, England formerly known as Warrington Borough Transport
 Web-based training
 Wet-bulb temperature